Balanagar or may refer to:

 Balanagar, Mahbubnagar district, a village in Telangana, India
 Balanagar, Medchal district, a suburb in Hyderabad, Medchal district, Telangana, India
 Balanagar mandal in Ranga Reddy district, Telangana, India